Willow Grove is a town and rural farming community located in the Baw Baw foothills. It is northwest of Moe in Victoria, Australia and North of Trafalgar. It has a primary school, football club (although named for the neighbouring town of Hill End), tennis courts, community hall, general store, CFA shed, and kindergarten. It is a popular tourist destination where people can enjoy trail bike riding, camping, four wheel driving & hunting. The next town to the west is Hill End and to the east Tanjil South. Willow Grove is situated within the Shire of Baw Baw and shares the postcode 3825.

History
Willow Grove Post Office opened on 9 November 1889.

Blue Rock
The artificial lake, known as Blue Rock Dam or Blue Rock Lake, is named for an early goldmine in the area. Construction of the dam began in 1979 and was completed in 1984. The dam has a potential capacity of 208,000 megalitres. In conjunction with other supplies such as the Moondarra Reservoir, it provides water for household use, agriculture, industry, and power generation in surrounding areas, particularly in the Latrobe Valley. The lake is also used for recreational activities including fishing, sailing, swimming and picnicking. The lake is surrounded by farmland, bushland and, to the base of Blue Rock Road, the township of Willow Grove.

Education
The community is serviced by a kindergarten and a public primary school, Willow Grove Primary School. At secondary level, students usually travel by school bus to the nearby towns of Moe, Trafalgar or Warragul/Drouin to attend Lowanna Secondary College, Lavalla Catholic College, Trafalgar High School, Chairo Christian School or Marist-Sion College.

Industry
The main industry in the Willow Grove area is dairy farming.

References

External links
Willow Grove Primary School website
Willow Grove Community Hall website

Towns in Victoria (Australia)
Shire of Baw Baw